Åke Fiskerstrand (born 23 April 1948) is a Norwegian rower. He competed in the men's coxless pair event at the 1972 Summer Olympics.

References

External links 
 

1948 births
Living people
Norwegian male rowers
Olympic rowers of Norway
Rowers at the 1972 Summer Olympics
Sportspeople from Ålesund